The Chainbreakers is a 2017 Chinese Tibet-themed epic film co-written and directed by Yang Rui, and stars Tobgyal, Lobsang Namdak, Wang Ziyi, Yang Xiucuo and Ngawang Rinchen. The film was released on December 8, 2017, in China. The film picks up the story of the People's Liberation Army (PLA) soldier Hua Shan participated in the peaceful liberation of Tibet and his contradiction of local Tibetan tribal chief, bandit and butler.

Plot
In the autumn of 1950, the 18th Army of the People's Liberation Army (PLA) march to Chamdo, Tibet from Sichuan, they plan to liberate Tibet and free all the slaves.

Cast
 Tobgyal
 Lobsang Namdak
 Wang Ziyi as Hua Shan, a soldier of the People's Liberation Army (PLA).
 Yang Xiucuo 
 Ngawang Rinchen

Production
In 2010, the producers began to negotiate with Yang Rui and Shan Yu, as well as Da Zhen, to write the film. In 2015, Yang Rui was signed to direct the film.

This film was shot in Tibet Autonomous Region, China.

The film's major cast members are all Tibetan natives except the lead actor Wang Ziyi.

Release
The film premiered at the Shanghai International Film Festival on June 21, 2017, and opened in China on December 8, 2017. On November 29, 2017, Yang Rui, Tobgyal and Lobsang Namdak attended the premiere for the film at Beijing Film Academy.

References

External links
 
 

2017 films
Chinese action films
Films about Tibet
Films scored by Pinar Toprak
Films shot in Tibet
Chinese epic films